The Leibniz Institute for Science and Mathematics Education at Kiel University (IPN;), previously known as the Leibniz Institute for Science Education, is a scientific institute in the field of Education Research  in Germany. It is a member of the Leibniz Association and located in Kiel, Germany.  the two maintain a strong relationship.

The institute was founded in 1966 by physicist Karl Hecht (with participation of Werner Krobel), who remained director until 1971.

History 

In 1957, the "Sputnik shock" caused a rethinking of education policy in the US and in Europe. Accordingly, Karl Hecht, in the early 1960s, proposed to establish an institute for science teaching and learning. 

On 1 December 1966, eight employees began working under Hecht in the Institute of Applied Physics at Kiel University; the first two departments were Physics Education and Chemistry Education. The IPN building was then constructed and opened in October 1970, following three years of construction work funded by the Volkswagen Foundation. Hecht remained director until 1971, when Karl Frey was appointed as Hecht's successor. 

The IPN became an institute of the state of Schleswig-Holstein on 1 January 1980. In 2007, the IPN became an "independent foundation governed by public law". 

In 2001, the IPN changed its name to the Leibniz Institute for Science Education (to demonstrate its affiliation to the Leibniz Community); it changed its name again in 2011 to the Leibniz Institute for Science and Mathematics Education at Kiel University.

Activities 
Its main purpose is to promote the development of educational research in the field of Natural Science. Among other studies the institute carried out the Programme for International Student Assessment 2003 and 2006, SINUS, ChiK, LeLa, LLL, LUV, System Earth as well as the GLOBE Program.

Department 
The institute has 202 employees and is structured into seven departments:

 Educational Research and Educational Psychology
Educational Measurement
Knowledge Transfer
  Biology Education
  Chemistry Education
  Physics Education
  Mathematics Education

as well as the department of paedagogical and psychological methods (part of the department for educational research).

Notable people and projects 

 In 2017, Katrin Kruse, a scientist at the IPN, supervised the project , where students aged 10 to 16 collected plastic waste in German rivers in a collaboration with the northern German research lab Kieler Forschungswerkstatt.
 The DoLiS project, which compares education in Germany to education in Sweden, is a collaboration between Umeå University and the IPN.

References

External links
 

Social science institutes
Leibniz Association
Educational research
University of Kiel
Kiel
Gottfried Wilhelm Leibniz